The 1968 Australia Cup was the seventh and final season of the Australia Cup, which was the main national association football knockout cup competition in Australia.

Teams

Quarter-finals

Semi-finals

First leg

Second leg

Sydney Hakoah won after Perth Azzurri forfeited the second leg.

	
Melbourne Hakoah won 4–3 on aggregate.

Final

First leg

Second leg

Sydney Hakoah won 6–1 on aggregate.

References

Australia Cup
Aust
Australia Cup (1962–1968) seasons